Lyubovka is a rural locality (a village) in Uslinsky Selsoviet, Sterlitamaksky District, Bashkortostan, Russia. The population was 88 as of 2010. There is 1 street.

Geography 
Lyubovka is located 36 km northwest of Sterlitamak (the district's administrative centre) by road. Churtan is the nearest rural locality.

References 

Rural localities in Sterlitamaksky District